Scorpion Tales was a British thriller television series, originally screened in 1978. Produced by ATV, the series was transmitted on the ITV network. It lasted just one season.

Overview 
The series comprised one-off hour-long plays, which featured a twist-ending. The format was similar in genre to the Thriller series, which had run successfully during the early to mid-1970s. The series was produced by David Reid who would go on to oversee similarly-themed series such as Sapphire & Steel and Hammer House of Horror. Reid also directed three of the stories, with Don Leaver, Shaun O'Riordan and John Bruce directing the others. The stories were written by experienced television scriptwriters such as Ian Kennedy Martin (The Sweeney), Jeremy Burnham (The Avengers), and Bob Baker and Dave Martin (Doctor Who). The opening credits featured a title sequence by Alastair McMunro depicting two scorpions fighting on a black background, with a theme by Cyril Ornadel. Among the guest casts were noted actors Trevor Howard, Don Henderson, Geoffrey Palmer, Susan Engel, Christopher Benjamin and Stephen Murray.

Scorpion Tales was first screened on ITV on 29 April 1978, running each Saturday until 29 May. The final episode was delayed until 12 August. The series failed to recapture the success of Thriller and was eclipsed by Armchair Thriller, which ITV were screening around the same time and was not renewed for a second series. Scorpion Tales was released on DVD by Network in December 2010, with a 15 certificate.

Episode guide

References

External links 
 

1970s British drama television series
ITV television dramas
British fantasy television series
1978 British television series debuts
1978 British television series endings
1970s British anthology television series
1970s British television miniseries
Television series by ITV Studios
Television shows produced by Associated Television (ATV)
English-language television shows